This is a list of current and upcoming programming on BET (Black Entertainment Television).

Current programming

Original programming

Drama

Comedy

Unscripted

Docuseries

Reality

Variety

Continuations
These shows have been picked up by BET for additional seasons after having aired previous seasons on another network.

Award shows
BET Awards (2001)
BET Hip Hop Awards (2006)
Soul Train Music Awards (2009)
BET Gospel Awards (2005)
NAACP Image Awards (2020)

Acquired programming
Family Matters (2009–2014; 2023–present)
My Wife and Kids (2011–2014; 2023–present)
The Fresh Prince of Bel-Air (2014)
Martin (2015)
Tyler Perry's House of Payne (2015)
Tyler Perry's Meet the Browns (2016)
Black-ish (2018)
The Neighborhood (2020)
Ruthless (2020)
Bruh (2022)
New York Undercover (2022)
The Game (2022)
The Ms. Pat Show (2022)
Ambitions (2022)
Kingdom Business (2022)
All the Queen's Men (2022)
College Hill: Celebrity Edition (2022)
Sacrifice (2022)
The Black Hamptons (2022)
Zatima (2022)

Upcoming programming

Drama

Comedy

In development

Former programming

Original programming

Drama
Being Mary Jane (2013–2019)
Rebel (2017)
The Quad (2017–2018)
Hit the Floor (2018)
In Contempt (2018)
The Family Business (2018)
American Soul (2019–2020)
Games People Play (2019–2021)
Long Slow Exhale (2022)

Comedy
Cita's World (1999–2003)
The Way We Do It (2001–2002)
Hey Monie! (2003)
S.O.B.: Socially Offensive Behavior (2007)
Somebodies (2008)
The Game (2011–2015)
Let's Stay Together (2011–2014)
Reed Between the Lines (2011)
Second Generation Wayans (2013)
Zoe Ever After (2016)
50 Central (2017)
The Comedy Get Down (2017)
Boomerang (2019–2020)
Twenties (2020–2021)

Miniseries
Madiba (2017)
The New Edition Story (2017)
The Bobby Brown Story (2018)

Docuseries
Death Row Chronicles (2018)
CopWatch America (2019)
Murder in the Thirst (2019)
No Limit Chronicles (2020)
Ruff Ryders Chronicles (2020)
Boiling Point (2021)
Disrupt & Dismantle (2021)
Klutch Academy (2021)
The Murder Inc Story (2022)

Reality
ComicView (1992–2008, 2014)
Testimony (2000–2004)
How I'm Living (2001–2003)
The Center (2002–2007)
Coming to the Stage (2003)
College Hill (2004–2009)
Keyshia Cole: The Way It Is (2006–2008)
Baldwin Hills (2007–2009)
Hell Date (2007–2008)
Sunday Best (2007–2015, 2019)
Brothers to Brutha (2008)
Iron Ring (2008)
Harlem Heights (2009)
Tiny and Toya (2009–2010)
The Family Crews (2010–2011)
The Michael Vick Project (2010)
Trey Songz: My Moment (2010) 
Keyshia & Daniel: Family First (2012)
Real Husbands of Hollywood (2013–2016)
Just Keke (2014)
Nellyville (2014–2015)
The BET Life Of... (2015)
DeSean Jackson: Home Team (2015)
It's a Mann's World (2015)
Keyshia Cole: All In (2015)
Punk'd (2015)
The Westbrooks (2015)
The Xperiment (2015)
About the Business (2016)
Chasing Destiny (2016)
Criminals at Work (2016)
The Gary Owen Show (2016)
Ink, Paper, Scissors (2016)
Music Moguls (2016)
Gucci Mane & Keyshia Ka'oir The Main Event (2017)
The Grand Hustle (2018)
Hustle in Brooklyn (2018)
RAQ Rants (2018)
Ladies' Night (2019)
The Next Big Thing (2019)
Keyshia Cole: My New Life (2019)
BET Presents: The Encore (2021)

Music & award shows
Bobby Jones Gospel (1980–2016)
Video Soul (1981–1996)
Video Vibrations (1984–1997)
Midnight Love (1985–2005)
Softnotes (1987–1991)
Video LP (1986–1993)
Rap City (1989–2008)
Video Gospel (1989, 2000–2005, 2010–2011)
All (1991–2000)
Planet Groove (1996–1999)
Jam Zone/Cita's World (1997–2003)
Videolink (1997–2000, 2001–2002)
Hits: From the Streets (1999–2003)
Lift Every Voice (1999–2017)
AM @ BET (2000–2001)
106 & Park (2000–2014)
BET Next (2000–2006)
BET:iNY (2000–2002)
Access Granted (2001–2010)
BET: Uncut (2001–2006)
BET.COM Countdown (2001–2006)
BET's Top 25 (2001–2008)
Celebration of Gospel (2001)
BET Start (2002–2005; 2006)
106 & Park Prime (2003–2004)
BET Music  (2003–2008)
BET Now (2003–2008)
The Center (2003–2007)
BET After Dark (2004–2007)
Top 20 Countdown (2005–2013)
Top 50 (2005–2006)
Remixed! (2005–2006)
Hotwyred (2006)
The 5ive (2007)
BET Honors (2008)
The Deal (2008–2010)
106 & Gospel (2009)
Joyful Noise (2016–2017)
One Shot (2016–2017)
Black Girls Rock! (2010)

Specials
Spring Bling (1997–2010)
Notarized (1999–2014) 
Rip the Runway (2005–2013)
A Very BET Christmas (2010–2011)
BET News Justice for Us: A BET Town Hall Live (2014)
Saving Our Selves (2020)

Entertainment
Karen's Kitchen (1982)
BET Style (2004–2006)
The Black Carpet (2006–2008)

News
Screen Scene (1990–1997)
BET Nightly News (2002–2005)
Don't Sleep! (2012)

Game shows
Tell Me Something Good (1988–1989)
Triple Threat (1992–1993)
Take the Cake (2007)
Black Card Revoked (2018)

Sports programming
Black College Football (1981–2005)
ABL on BET (1996–1998)
BET's MAAD Sports (1998–2000)
Roc Nation Sports Live Boxing (2015)

Talk shows
Teen Summit (1989–2002)
Oh, Drama! (2000–2001)
Personal Diary
The Mo'Nique Show (2009–2011)
The Rundown with Robin Thede (2017–2018)
Mancave (2018)
Twenties After-Show With B. Scott (2021)

Children's shows
Story Porch (1992–1996)
The Fabulous Reggae Dogs (1995)

Syndicated programming

Drama
Soul Food (2004–2005)
The Wire (2006–2008)
Scandal (2013–2017)
Black&SexyTV (2015)
First Wives Club (2021–22)
American Gangster: Trap Queens (2021–22)
Survivor's Remorse (2021)
The Chi (2021)

Comedy
Soap (1989)
Sanford and Son (1989–1991; 1996)
Sanford (1991–1997; 2008)
What's Happening!! (1993–1995)
What's Happening Now!! (1993–1995)
Roc (1994–1996; 2004)
Benson (1995–1997)
Thea (1995–1999; 2008)
227 (1997–1999)
Sparks (1998–2000)
Amen (1999–2001)
The Parkers (2003–2009; 2011–2013; 2019–2022)
The Cosby Show (2004–2007)
Girlfriends (2004–2011; 2019)
Hangin' with Mr. Cooper (2004–2014)
The Hughleys (2005–2006)
In Living Color (2005–2008; 2010)
The Jamie Foxx Show (2005–2008; 2009–2016)
Cosby (2006–2008)
The Facts of Life (2006–2007)
The Wayans Bros. (2006–2008; 2014–2016)
Diff'rent Strokes (2008)
Fatherhood (2008–2009)
Malcolm & Eddie (2008)
One on One (2008–2010)
Smart Guy (2008–2009)
The Steve Harvey Show (2008–2011; 2014; 2019)
The Bernie Mac Show (2009–2012; 2017)
Family Matters (2009–2014)
Sister, Sister (2009–2010)
City Guys (2010)
Moesha (2013–2014)
Family Feud (2014)
Instant Mom (2014)
Eve (2016)
Dish Nation (2016)
In the House (2016)
George Lopez (2017)
A Different World (2018–2020)
Everybody Hates Chris (2018)
The Good Fight (2020)
The Cleveland Show (2020–2021)
Bigger (2021–2022)
The Family Business (2021)
Living Single (2021–2023)

Talk shows
The Montel Williams Show (2008–2009)
The Wendy Williams Show (2009–2017) (moved to Bounce TV)
The Queen Latifah Show (2014–2015)
The Real (2014–2017) (moved to Bounce TV)

Game shows
Celebrity Family Feud (2021–2022)

Kids & family
Just Jordan (2007–2009)
Romeo! (2007–2009)
True Jackson, VP (2009)
Black Panther (2011)

Notes

References

 
Bet